Harry Robert Stoneback (July 14, 1941 - December 22, 2021) was an American academic, poet, and folk singer. A Hemingway, Durrell, and Faulkner scholar of international distinction, Stoneback — who, as an itinerant musician in the early 1960s, collaborated with Jerry Jeff Walker (a period immortalized in Walker's 1970 song "Stoney") and played with Bob Dylan at Gerde's Folk City shortly after Dylan's arrival in New York — is best known for illuminating the religious and folkloric undertones of Modernist and allied regional literatures in over 100 essays. Joe Haldeman has described Stoneback as the "eminence grise" of Hemingway studies.

In recent years, Stoneback played an integral role in the critical reappraisal of Richard Aldington and Elizabeth Madox Roberts, co-editing two anthologies of literary criticism about Roberts and serving as honorary director of the Elizabeth Madox Roberts Society. A former senior Fulbright Scholar at Peking University , Saint-John Perse Fellow of the French-American Foundation in Aix-en-Provence, and Visiting Professor at the University of Paris (where he concurrently served as director of the now-defunct American Center for Students and Artists), he was a Distinguished Teaching Professor of English at the State University of New York at New Paltz, where he taught since 1969 and once curated the Norman Studer Archives. Stoneback was President of the Ernest Hemingway Society, 2014–2017. Stoneback holds degrees from Rutgers University, the University of Hawaiʻi at Mānoa, and Vanderbilt University (PhD, 1970).

Commenting on Stoneback's Hemingway's Paris: Our Paris?, Valerie Hemingway  wrote, "H.R. Stoneback knows his Hemingway and his Paris. I had the incomparable experience of visiting Paris twice while working for Ernest Hemingway in 1959. I viewed the city at the side of the writer while he added the finishing touches to A Moveable Feast. Professor Stoneback's evocation of Hemingway's Paris of the 1920s is as close as I have come since to reliving those Paris days in the company of Ernest Hemingway. Reading this book will be a treat for all who love Hemingway and Paris, and a pleasant surprise for all readers."

Recent publications
Hemingway's Paris: Our Paris? New Street Communications, LLC. 2010. 
Hurricane Hymn & Other Poems. Codhill Press, 2009.

References

1941 births
American academics of English literature
American literary critics
Vanderbilt University alumni
Academic staff of the University of Paris
State University of New York faculty